Minuscule 641 (in the Gregory-Aland numbering), Ο16 (von Soden), is a Greek minuscule manuscript of the New Testament, on parchment. Palaeographically to the 11th century. The manuscript is lacunose. Gregory  labeled it by 204a and 260p.

Description 

The codex contains the text of the Acts, Catholic epistles, Pauline epistles on 248 parchment leaves (size ) with some lacunae (Acts 4:15-32; Ephesians 6:21-24; Hebrews 13:24-25). The text is written in one column per page, 20 lines per page for biblical text, and 56 lines per page for a commentary.

It contains Prolegomena, tables of the  before each sacred book, subscriptions at the end of each book, and numbers of stichoi in subscriptions. It has a commentary of Oecumenius.

The order of books: Acts of the Apostles, Catholic epistles, and Pauline epistles. Epistle to the Hebrews is placed after Epistle to Philemon.

Text 

Kurt Aland the Greek text of the codex did not place in any Category.

History 

The manuscript is dated by the INTF to the 11th century.

The manuscript once belonged to Giovanni Cardinal de Salviatis († 1553), then to Pope Pius VI. It was bought in 1859 for the British Museum. The manuscript was added to the list of New Testament manuscripts by Gregory (as 204a and 260p). Gregory saw the manuscript in 1883. In 1908 Gregory gave the number 641 to it.

The manuscript is currently housed at the British Library (Add MS 22734) in London.

See also 

 List of New Testament minuscules
 Biblical manuscript
 Textual criticism

References 

Greek New Testament minuscules
11th-century biblical manuscripts
British Library additional manuscripts